My Generation is a 1996 Italian drama film written and directed by Wilma Labate.

The film won the Grolla d'oro for best film. It was also the Italian candidate in the race for the 1997 Academy Awards for Best Foreign Film.

Plot 
1983. Braccio (Amendola), a political prisoner (he was a terrorist) is brought from Sicily to Milan by a captain of the Carabinieri (Orlando). He was given talks with his girlfriend. During the journey the captain shows himself kind, open, on his side. Arriving almost at destination the officer throws the mask. It was all a trick, the prisoner will have privileges, and perhaps soon freedom, if he speaks and denounces one of his fugitive comrades, probably murderer of a policeman. Braccio refuses and he's brought back to Sicily.

Cast 

Claudio Amendola as	Braccio
Silvio Orlando as	 Captain
Francesca Neri as	Giulia
Stefano Accorsi as	 Carabiniere Bonoli
Anna Melato as	 Elena	
Vincenzo Peluso as	 Concilio	
Hossein Taheri as	 Carabiniere Caruso
Arnaldo Ninchi as Penzo
Paolo De Vita as Marshal S. Alba
Alessandra Vanzi as Prostitute

See also
 List of submissions to the 69th Academy Awards for Best Foreign Language Film
 List of Italian submissions for the Academy Award for Best Foreign Language Film

References

External links

1996 films
Italian drama films
1996 drama films
Films directed by Wilma Labate
Films scored by Nicola Piovani
1990s Italian films